The LAW 80 (Light Anti-armour Weapon 80), regularly referred to as LAW 94 in British service, is a man-portable, disposable anti-tank weapon previously used by the British Army and a few other militaries.

Description
The weapon consists of an extendable launch tube with an integrated  spotting rifle and 1× sight. The spotting rifle has five rounds of ammunition, and is ballistically matched to the rocket. The rounds it uses are quite unusual, consisting of a 9 mm tracer bullet loaded in a necked up 7.62mm NATO shell casing, with a .22 Hornet blank mounted in the base of the larger case, providing the propellant charge. Upon firing, the .22 cartridge case pushes out of the back of the 7.62 mm casing, unlocking the breech of the spotting rifle in a form of primer actuation. 

To launch the rocket the firer removes the large protective end caps and extends the rear of the launch tube, opens the sight, and moves the arming lever to "armed". The weapon is then in spotting rifle mode. To fire the rocket, the firer moves a charge lever forward with his firing hand thumb. The rocket motor burns out before it leaves the launch tube, the resulting blast being directed rearwards from the launch tube. The rocket then coasts to the target, arming itself after it has passed a certain arming distance. The warhead is a HEAT shaped charge and could penetrate  of rolled homogeneous armour at 90 degrees, as was taught to soldiers trained on the weapon system in the British Army, Royal Navy (Royal Marines) and RAF Regiment.  It was also taught that sloped, composite and reactive armour, would reduce the penetration and would be an important factor when selecting the aiming point.

Specifications

 Contractor: Hunting Engineering
 Calibre: 94 mm
 Launcher length:
 Firing mode: 1.5 m
 Carrying mode: 1 m
 Weight:
 Carrying weight: 10 kg
 Shoulder weight: 9 kg
 Projectile weight: 4.6 kg
 Dispersion: approx 1 mil
 Warhead arming range: 10 to 20 m
 Effective range: 20 to 500 m
 Fuze:
 Type: Piezo-electric impact fuze, shrub and foliage proof
 Graze angle: ≤ 10°
 Temperature range: −46 °C to +65 °C
 Rear danger area: < 20 m
 Shelf life: 10 years

Operators

Current operators

Past operators
 : Initially adopted in the early 1990s, replacing the L14A1 84 mm Carl Gustav recoilless rifle and M72 Light Anti-Tank Weapon (Rocket 66mm HEAT L1A1), it was withdrawn on safety grounds in favour of the AT-4 CS and eventually the FGM-148 Javelin anti-tank missile and NLAW.

Addermine
Addermine is an acoustic sensor system which uses the LAW 80 as a kill mechanism to create an anti-armour off-route mine. It can also be command detonated from up to 200 m away, or 2 km via a laser optical link.

Notes

See also
 ARGES mine
 APILAS
 Alcotán-100

References
 Jane's Infantry Weapons 2005-2006
 Jane's Infantry Weapons 1991-1992

External links

 https://web.archive.org/web/20040927085242/http://www.army.mod.uk/equipment/pw/pw_law.htm
www.armedforces.co.uk

Anti-tank rockets
Anti-tank guided missiles of the United Kingdom
Cold War weapons of the United Kingdom
Military equipment introduced in the 1980s